Olaiyur is a Village Panchayat at Udayarpalayam taluk of Ariyalur district, Tamil Nadu, India.

Geography
Olaiyur is located at Ariyalur District.

Demographics

As per the 2001 census, Olaiyur had a total population of 2717 with 1357 males and 1360 females.

Climate
The climate is cool and hot, rainy during September–November. Temperatures during the summer reach maximum 38 and minimum of 22 degrees Celsius. Winter temperatures between 30  to 17 degrees Celsius.

Occupation
More than 90% people are depending on Agriculture directly or indirectly. Olaiyur is the major sugarcane producing village in the District.

This village has excellent literacy rate. Cashew nuts are major products next to sugarcane.

Education
This village hosts a Government Higher Education School, which is one of the primitive school in the locality. Now there are 3 schools in the village.

Facilities
The village hosts Post office, TNEB Sub Station but lacks a primary health centre.

References

Villages in Ariyalur district